Rowland John Rivron (born 28 September 1958) is a British writer, comedic actor and television personality.

Early career
Rivron played the comic character "Dr Martin Scrote" on the Jonathan Ross chat show The Last Resort, and also played Scrote on Night Network's Bunker Show. This became a series for Channel 4 called Set of Six about Scrote and his brothers. In 1989 he and Jools Holland starred in The Groovy Fellers. In the early 1990s he presented his own chat show, Rivron, in which Rivron, his guests and the entire set floated in the River Thames. He also made an appearance in the children's schools series Cats' Eyes.

Music
Rivron played drums on Fat Les's 1998 single "Vindaloo". As one half of the band "Raw Sex" (with Simon Brint) he also featured regularly on BBC TV's French and Saunders show.

Rivron featured on drums in the "Sophisticated Fool" song and "All We've Got To Do Is..." song from A Bit of Fry and Laurie, also on BBC TV. He was a contributing writer to Rhythm, a UK drumming magazine, and is a regular guest on Jools Holland's BBC shows, in which he once demonstrated a square snare drum made by Robert Daniels. Rivron appeared on the children's TV programme Blue Peter at age 15, playing the drums.

For eighteen months Rivron drummed for Jools Holland's Rhythm and Blues Orchestra. He later played with the Idiot Bastard Band, with Adrian Edmondson, Phill Jupitus and Neil Innes.

Television

Presenting
Rivron regularly presented television shows such as Holiday and Summer Holiday.
Rowland Rivron presented the comedy BBC Radio 2 shows Jammin' and Radio Rivron, and starred in the Channel 5 programme Trust Me - I'm A Holiday Rep. He also co-presented the Saturday breakfast show on BBC London 94.9.

Rivron also appeared on Richard & Judy's New Position as the celebrity barman. He also presented the video to promote One Foot in the Grave for the title of BBC Britain's Best Sitcom in 2004.

Game shows
Rivron acted as a team captain on Question of TV on BBC One, and was a panellist on the first episode of Shooting Stars on BBC Two. A special celebrity edition of the show "Incredible Games" was broadcast at the end of its first season with Philippa Forrester and Keith Chegwin appearing alongside Rivron as the contestants in place of the usual kids taking part (who were shown to be tied up before the games started). In 2004 he hosted the short-lived regional gameshow The Price of Fish, starring local commercial radio presenters. The gameshow was filmed at The Talk venue in Norwich and shown only in the Anglia TV region. In 2006 Rivron was part of Channel 4's Come Dine with Me. He was the first celebrity to be voted out on 2007's edition of Comic Relief Does Fame Academy.

In 2012, Rivron was a contestant on Let's Dance for Sport Relief with his take on the Fatboy Slim music video Weapon of Choice, winning his heat and going straight through to the live final on Sport Relief, which he went on to win on 17 March 2012.

On 1 December 2012, he took part in an episode of Pointless Celebrities on BBC One, as well as a Sport Relief special on 21 March 2014, paired with Mark Durden-Smith.

Acting
In 1984, Rivron appeared in the episode "Cash" of The Young Ones. In 1994 he starred in the improvised comedy film There's No Business..., and in the BBC children's science programme Cats' Eyes: in 2005 he appeared in the BBC One sitcom Blessed. In 1990 he appeared as the main characters – the six Scrote brothers – in Set of Six (TV series).

Activism
In October 2007, Rivron "waded into an unholy row" over plans for a mobile phone mast planned for the tower of his local church in North London. After joining the mass protest, he explained: "It's not really needed... In the Good Book they turned water into wine and now they're turning masts into misery". Fellow campaigner Paul Barnard commenting: "We were very grateful to Rowland Rivron for his support and he managed to cheer people up with his quips and jokes".

Personal life
Rivron was born in Aylesbury, Buckinghamshire, and brought up in Hillingdon, and attended Abbotsfield Secondary School. He has two brothers, Richard and Raymond.

He and his wife Monica (née Appleby), have three children and two dogs. The couple are avid caravanners, and Monica is the author of The Caravan Cookbook.

References

External links
Rowland Rivron Biography Off the Kerb Productions
Ask Rowland Rivron transcript BBC Chat Archive
Watch Rowland Rivron's story writing tips BBC raw words

1958 births
Living people
British television presenters
People from Aylesbury
People from Muswell Hill
English male comedians
The Comic Strip
20th-century English comedians
21st-century English comedians